The 2002 New Mexico gubernatorial election was a race for the Governor of New Mexico. The winner of the election held on November 5, 2002, served from January 1, 2003 until January 1, 2007. Incumbent Republican Gary Johnson was term limited. Former U.S. Congressman Bill Richardson won the election. Green Party nominee David Bacon received over 5% of the total vote, including over 11% in Santa Fe County, which was his best showing.

Democratic primary

Candidates
Bill Richardson, former United States Secretary of Energy, former United States Ambassador to the United Nations and former U.S. Representative
Mike Nalley (write-in)

Results

Republican primary

Candidates
Gilbert S. Baca, State Representative
Robert M. Burpo, State Senator
Walter Bradley, Lieutenant Governor
John Sanchez, State Representative

Results

General election

Candidates
Bill Richardson (D), former United States Secretary of Energy, former United States Ambassador to the United Nations and former U.S. Representative
John Sanchez (R), State Representative
David Bacon (G)

Predictions

Results

References

External links
Official campaign websites (Archived)
Bill Richardson

See also

Governor
2002
New Mexico